Macedonia participated in the Junior Eurovision Song Contest 2013 in Kyiv, Ukraine. The Macedonian entry was selected through an internal selection. On 17 October 2013 it was revealed that Barbara Popović would represent Macedonia in the contest. It was announced on 30 October 2013 that her song would be called "Ohrid i muzika".

Internal selection
On 26 September, it was reported that the Macedonian broadcaster MRT decided to internally select their 2013 artist. On 17 October 2013, MRT revealed that 13-year-old Barbara Popović would represent Macedonia. The title of the song was revealed to be "Ohrid i muzika" on 30 October 2013.

The song was presented to the public on 7 November 2013.

At Junior Eurovision 

During the allocation draw on 25 November 2013, Macedonia was drawn to perform 5th, following San Marino and preceding Ukraine. Macedonia placed 12th and last, scoring 19 points.

Barbara Popović were joined on stage by three dancers from the ballet studio "Eureka": Ognen Angushev, Emilijana Jovkovska and Sara Kastratovic.

In Macedonia, show were broadcast on MRT with commentary by Tina Teutovic and Spasija Veljanoska. The Macedonian spokesperson revealing the result of the Macedonian vote was Sofija Spasenoska.

Voting

Notes

References

Junior Eurovision Song Contest
Macedonia
2013